Two Way Street may refer to:
Two-way street
Two Way Street (1930 film)
"Two Way Street" (song), by Kimbra, 2012

See also
It takes two to tango, a common idiomatic expression